Manuel Magalhaes de Oliveira (born 20 September 1951 – 9 September 1999) was a CNRT (Conselho Nacional de Resistência Timorense) Leader in Bobonaro District. CNRT is a National Council of East Timorese Resistance against 24 years of Indonesian brutal occupation.
Already fluent in Portuguese, Tetun and several dialects, Manuel Magalhaes mastered the Indonesian language less than a year after Indonesia's 1975 invasion of East Timor. His fluency in languages also enabled him to establish trust with Indonesia and obtain a government job. His job allowed him to spy for East Timor's clandestine resistance.

Manuel Magalhaes was killed 9 September 1999, 5 days after the result East Timorese referendum where majority chose to be independent. He was killed at a lagoon near Maliana. Witnesses said Magalhaes was shot, his body hacked to pieces and tossed into the sea. The body was never found

References 

1951 births
1999 deaths
East Timorese politicians
East Timorese murder victims
People murdered in East Timor